The 2005–06 season saw Bournemouth compete in Football League One where they finished in 17th position with 55 points.

Final league table

Results

Football League One

FA Cup

Football League Cup

Football League Trophy

Squad Statistics

References 

A.F.C. Bournemouth
AFC Bournemouth seasons
English football clubs 2005–06 season